Tripolar or Tri-Polar may refer to:
 Tripolarity, a system of power in international relations
 Tri-Polar, an album by Sick Puppies

See also
 Multipolar (disambiguation)